The 1st Parliament of Ontario was in session from September 3, 1867, until February 25, 1871, just prior to the 1871 general election. This was the first session of the Legislature after Confederation succeeding the Legislative Assembly of the Province of Canada (last session was the 8th Parliament of the Province of Canada). The 1867 general election produced a tie between the Conservative Party led by John Sandfield Macdonald and the Liberal Party led by Archibald McKellar. Macdonald led a coalition government with the support of moderate Liberals.

John Stevenson served as speaker for the assembly.

References

Notes

External links
 All Members serving in Parliament 1 

1867 establishments in Ontario
1871 disestablishments in Ontario
01